Harrison Foster Williams (born March 7, 1996) is an American decathlete.

On July 26, 2019, he finished third at the USA Track and Field Championships in Des Moines with 8188 points, a personal best at the time. As a result, he participated at the 2019 World Athletics Championships, finishing 14th with 7892 points.

On April 25, 2021, Williams set a new personal best of 8439, making him the 10th best American decathlete in history and the 70th best decathlete ever.

Personal life 
Williams graduated from Stanford University with a B.S. in Product Design in 2019.

International competitions

References

External links
IAAF

1996 births
Living people
American male decathletes
Place of birth missing (living people)
Stanford Cardinal men's track and field athletes
Track and field athletes from Houston
World Athletics Championships athletes for the United States